John Dudley Meadows III (August 28, 1944 – November 13, 2018) was an American businessman and politician from Georgia. Meadows is a former mayor of Calhoun and a Republican member of Georgia House of Representatives.

Early life 
On August 28, 1944, Meadows was born in Calhoun, Georgia. Meadows' father was John Dudley Meadows, Jr. and his mother was Doris Esther Scott “Scottie” Meadows. In 1962, Meadows graduated from Calhoun High School.

Education 
Meadows attended West Georgia College. In 1986, Meadows earned a Chartered Life Underwriter (ALU) certificate from American College. In 1991, Meadows earned a Chartered Financial Consultant certificate from American College.

Career 
In military, Meadows served in the United States Marine Corps.
Meadows worked in the insurance business.

In 1983, Meadows was elected as a city council member of Calhoun, Georgia. In 1986, Meadows served as mayor of Calhoun, Georgia, until 1998.

On November 2, 2004, Meadows won the election unopposed and became a Republican member of Georgia House of Representatives for District 5. Meadows continued serving District 5. On November 8, 2016, as an incumbent, Meadows won the election unopposed and continued serving District 5. On November 6, 2018, as an incumbent, Meadows won the election. Meadows defeated Brian Rosser with  81.56% of the votes. With Meadows' death, Meadows was unable to serve District 5 in the 2019–2020 term.5.

Personal life 
Meadows' wife is Marie Meadows. They have two children. Meadows and his family live in Calhoun, Georgia.

On November 13, 2018, Meadows died from cancer in Calhoun, Georgia. Meadows was 74.

References

External links 
 John D. Meadows III at ballotpedia.org

1944 births
2018 deaths
Republican Party members of the Georgia House of Representatives
People from Calhoun, Georgia
University of West Georgia alumni
Military personnel from Georgia (U.S. state)
Businesspeople from Georgia (U.S. state)
Georgia (U.S. state) city council members
Mayors of places in Georgia (U.S. state)
21st-century American politicians
United States Marines
20th-century American businesspeople
Deaths from cancer in Georgia (U.S. state)